Route 309 is a collector road in the Canadian province of Nova Scotia.

It is located in Shelburne County and connects Barrington at Trunk 3/Highway 103 with Clyde River at Trunk 3/Highway 103.

Communities
Barrington
Coffinscroft
Villagedale
Upper Port La Tour
Reynoldscroft
Eel Bay
Thomasville
Port Clyde
Clyde River

Parks
Sand Hills Provincial Park

See also
List of Nova Scotia provincial highways

References

Nova Scotia provincial highways
Roads in Shelburne County, Nova Scotia